Pensiangan is a federal constituency in Interior Division (Keningau District and Nabawan District), Sabah, Malaysia, that has been represented in the Dewan Rakyat from 1986 to 1995, from 2004 to present.

The federal constituency was created in the 1984 redistribution and is mandated to return a single member to the Dewan Rakyat under the first past the post voting system.

Demographics 
https://ge15.orientaldaily.com.my/seats/sabah/p

History
It was abolished in 1995 when it was redistributed. It was re-created in 2003.

Polling districts 
According to the gazette issued on 31 October 2022, the Pensiangan constituency has a total of 38 polling districts.

Representation history

State constituency

Current state assembly members

Local governments

Election results

References

Sabah federal constituencies